Catering is the business of providing food service at a remote site or a site such as a hotel, hospital, pub, aircraft, cruise ship, park, festival, filming location or film studio.

History of catering
The earliest account of major services being catered in the United States is a 1778 ball in Philadelphia catered by Caesar Cranshell to celebrate the departure of British General William Howe. The catering business began to form around 1820, centered in Philadelphia. Catering became a respectable and profitable business. The early catering industry was disproportionately African-Americans.

The industry began to professionalize under the reigns of Robert Bogle who is recognized as "the originator of catering." By 1840, the second generation of Philadelphia black caterers formed, who began to combine their catering businesses with restaurants they owned. Common usage of the word "caterer" came about in the 1880s at which point local directories began listing numerous caterers. White businessmen eventually moved into the industry and by the 1930s, the black businesses had virtually disappeared.

In the 1930s, the Soviet Union, creating more simple menus, began developing state public catering establishments as part of its collectivization policies. A rationing system was implemented during World War II, and people became used to public catering. After the Second World War, many businessmen embraced catering as an alternative way of staying in business after the war. By the 1960s, the home-made food was overtaken by eating in public catering establishments.

By the 2000s, personal chef services started gaining popularity, with more women entering the workforce. People between 15 and 24 years of age spent as little as 11–17 minutes daily on food preparation and clean-up activities in 2006-2016, according to figures revealed by the American Time Use Survey conducted by the US Bureau of Labor Statistics. There are many types of catering, including Event catering, Wedding Catering and Corporate Catering.

Event catering

An event caterer serves food at indoor and outdoor events, including corporate events and parties at home.

Mobile catering

A mobile caterer serves food directly from a vehicle, cart or truck which is designed for the purpose. Mobile catering is common at outdoor events such as concerts, workplaces, and downtown business districts. Mobile catering services require less maintenance costs when compared with other catering services. Mobile caterers may also be known as food trucks in some areas.

Seat-back catering
Seat-back catering was a service offered by some charter airlines in the United Kingdom (e.g., Court Line, which introduced the idea in the early 1970s, and Dan-Air) that involved embedding two meals in a single seat-back tray. "One helping was intended for each leg of a charter flight, but Alan Murray, of Viking Aviation, had earlier revealed that 'with the ingenious use of a nail file or coin, one could open the inbound meal and have seconds'. The intention of participating airlines was to "save money, reduce congestion in the cabin and give punters the chance to decide when to eat their meal". By requiring less galley space on board, the planes could offer more passenger seats.

According to TravelUpdates columnist, "The Flight Detective", "Salads and sandwiches were the usual staples," and "a small pellet of dry ice was put into the compartment for the return meal to try to keep it fresh." However, in addition to the fact that passengers on one leg were able to consume the food intended for other passengers on the following leg, there was a "food hygiene" problem, and the concept was discontinued by 1975.

Canapé catering

A canapé caterer serves canapés at events. They have become a popular type of food at events, Christmas parties and weddings.

A canapé is a type of hors d'oeuvre, a small, prepared, and often decorative food, consisting of a small piece of bread or pastry. They should be easier to pick up and not be bigger than one or two bites. The bite-sized food is usually served before the starter or main course or alone with drinks at a drinks party.

Wedding catering
A wedding caterer provides food for a wedding reception and party, traditionally called a wedding breakfast. A wedding caterer can be hired independently or can be part of a package designed by the venue. There are many different types of wedding caterers, each with their own approach to food.

Shipboard catering
Merchant ships – especially ferries, cruise liners, and large cargo ships – often carry Catering Officers. In fact, the term "catering" was in use in the world of the merchant marine long before it became established as a land-bound business.

See also

Aircraft ground handling
Airline meal
Food truck
Gastronorm, a European standard for food container sizes
Online food ordering

References